Rhopaloblaste is a genus of flowering plant in the family Arecaceae, native to New Guinea, Melanesia and Southeast Asia.

It contains the following species:

Rhopaloblaste augusta  (Kurz) H.E.Moore - Nicobar Islands, Peninsular Malaysia & Singapore, the Moluccas, New Guinea & the Solomon Islands
Rhopaloblaste ceramica (Miq.) Burret - New Guinea, Maluku
Rhopaloblaste elegans  H.E.Moore - Solomon Islands
Rhopaloblaste gideonii Banka - New Ireland
Rhopaloblaste ledermanniana Becc. - New Guinea
Rhopaloblaste singaporensis (Becc.) Hook.f. - Singapore and Peninsular Malaysia

References

 
Arecaceae genera
Taxonomy articles created by Polbot